The Rocky Horror Punk Rock Show is an album featuring the soundtrack of the 1975 cult film The Rocky Horror Picture Show as performed by modern punk rock bands. The album was released in 2003 on Springman Records.

Background
The album started as a project by Shawn "Eddie Migraine" Browning, who got the idea from his wife. Work for the project started in 1999. Browning said he was a "huge Rocky Horror fan back in High School", and that the show was "where some of us fit in" and "brought us all together".

Critical reception
A Punk News reviewer said "while a number of songs suffer from sub-par recordings [or sub-par arrangements], there are some highlights".

Track listing
 "Science Fiction/Double Feature" - Me First and the Gimme Gimmes
 "Dammit, Janet" - Love Equals Death
 "Over at the Frankenstein Place" - Alkaline Trio
 "The Time Warp" - The Groovie Ghoulies
 "Sweet Transvestite" - Apocalypse Hoboken
 "The Sword of Damocles" - The Independents
 "I Can Make You a Man" - Pansy Division
 "Hot Patootie (Bless My Soul)" - The Phenomenauts
 "I Can Make You A Man (Reprise)" - The Secretions
 "Touch-A, Touch-A, Touch Me" - Chubbies
 "Once in a While" - Big D and the Kids Table
 "Eddie's Teddy" - Swingin' Utters
 "Planet, Schmanet, Janet" - Tsunami Bomb
 "Rose Tint My World/Floor Show" - Luckie Strike
 "Fanfare/Don't Dream It" - Stunt Monkey
 "Wild and Untamed Thing" - Gametime
 "I'm Going Home" - The Migranes
 "Super Heroes" - Ruth's Hat
 "Science Fiction Double Feature (Reprise)" - The Ataris

Personnel 
Artists and repertoire for this album was done by Eddie Migrane of The Migranes and Avi Ehrlich of Springman Records. Artwork by Steve Rolston.

References 

Rocky Horror
Punk revival compilation albums
2003 compilation albums
Horror punk compilation albums
Covers albums
Tribute albums